"The Coffin Maker" is a poem by the Indian English poet Gopi Krishnan Kottoor. The poem won Second Prize in the Sixth All India Poetry Competition conducted by The Poetry Society (India) in 1995. This was the first major literary award for Kottoor, who went on to win four more major poetry awards at All India Poetry Competition.

Comments and criticism

The poem has received positive reviews since its first publication in 1995 in the book Emerging Voices and has since been widely anthologised. The poem has been frequently quoted in scholarly analysis of contemporary Indian English poetry. The poem has become very popular in Indian English literature and has been widely anthologised.

See also
The Poetry Society (India)

Notes

External links

 
  Sixth National Poetry Competition 1995 – Award Winners
  The Coffin Maker – The Full Poem
Gopi Kottoor and His Poems
  India Writes – Contemporary Indian Poetry
"Popular Indian Poems"

Indian English poems
1995 poems
Works originally published in Indian magazines
Works originally published in literary magazines